Shane Hnidy (born November 8, 1975) is a Canadian former professional ice hockey defenceman. Between 2000 and 2011, he played in the National Hockey League (NHL) for the Ottawa Senators, Nashville Predators, Atlanta Thrashers, Anaheim Ducks, Boston Bruins, and Minnesota Wild. He is currently part of the Vegas Golden Knights broadcast team on AT&T SportsNet Rocky Mountain.

Playing career
Hnidy played junior hockey with the Swift Current Broncos and Prince Albert Raiders of the WHL. He was drafted in the 7th round (173rd overall) in the 1994 NHL Entry Draft by the Buffalo Sabres, although he played no games for the team. After turning professional in 1996, he played for minor league teams Saint John of the AHL, Grand Rapids of the IHL, Cincinnati and Adirondack of the AHL before being traded to the Ottawa Senators in 2000 where he established his NHL career. He has also played for the Anaheim Ducks, Atlanta Thrashers and Nashville Predators.

On January 2, 2008, the Boston Bruins acquired Hnidy and a 6th rounder in the 2008 NHL Entry Draft for Brandon Bochenski.

On July 3, 2009, Hnidy signed as an unrestricted free agent with the Minnesota Wild to a one-year contract.

As of the opening of the 2010-11 season, Hnidy remained an unsigned free agent. On February 23, 2011, it was announced Hnidy would be re-joining the Boston Bruins on a try-out basis. On February 26, 2011, Hnidy signed a contract with the Bruins for the remainder of the season, to serve as a depth defenseman. The Bruins won the Stanley Cup by defeating the Vancouver Canucks in a 7-game Stanley Cup Final. Though his name does not appear on the Stanley Cup, he was awarded a Stanley Cup ring and was included on the official team picture. He was given a day with the Stanley Cup on August 18, 2011, and officially retired on August 31, 2011.

Post-retirement
Hnidy continues to give back to his home town of Neepawa with his support of the annual Shane Hnidy Golf Tournament, a significant fund raiser for the Beautiful Plains Community Foundation.

From 2011 to 2017, Hnidy was part of the Winnipeg Jets broadcast team on TSN Radio 1290 and the colourman with Dennis Beyak during Winnipeg Jets games on TSN Television. Hnidy was announced as a color-commentator for the NHL's Vegas Golden Knights for their 2017–18 inaugural season on August 16, 2017.

Career statistics

Transactions
 June 28, 1994 - drafted by Buffalo Sabres in the 7th round, 173rd overall
 August 6, 1998 - signed as free agent by Detroit Red Wings
 June 25, 2000 - traded by Red Wings to Ottawa Senators
 March 9, 2004 - traded by Senators to Nashville Predators for 2004 draft pick used to pick Peter Regin
 June 30, 2005 - traded by Predators to Atlanta Thrashers
 July 5, 2007 - signed as unrestricted free agent by Anaheim Ducks
 January 2, 2008 - traded by Ducks to Boston Bruins
 July 3, 2009 - signed as unrestricted free agent by Minnesota Wild
 August 10, 2010 - invited to training camp by Phoenix Coyotes
 February 23, 2011 - joined the Boston Bruins on a try out basis
 February 26, 2011 - signed as free agent by Boston Bruins

References

External links

Shane Hnidy's Biography at NHLPA.com
Shane Hnidy's career stats at TSN.ca
Shane Hnidy Charity Golf Tournament

1975 births
Adirondack Red Wings players
Anaheim Ducks players
Atlanta Thrashers players
Baton Rouge Kingfish players
Boston Bruins players
Buffalo Sabres draft picks
Canadian ice hockey defencemen
Cincinnati Mighty Ducks players
Grand Rapids Griffins (IHL) players
Ice hockey people from Manitoba
Living people
Minnesota Wild players
Nashville Predators players
Ottawa Senators players
Swift Current Broncos players
Neepawa Natives players
People from Neepawa, Manitoba
Stanley Cup champions
Vegas Golden Knights announcers
Winnipeg Jets announcers